Caldicott Preparatory School is a prep school for boys aged 7–13 in southern Buckinghamshire, England.

About Caldicott 
Caldicott Preparatory School was founded in Hitchin, Hertfordshire in 1904 by James Heald Jenkins who named his school after his new bride, a Miss Theodora Caldicott Ingram. There were just eight boys. In 1938 the school moved to its present site in Farnham Royal in Buckinghamshire, and became a charitable trust in 1968 under the Headmaster at the time Peter Wright. Today there are around 250 boys. The school's governors include past parents, old boys and headmasters of public schools.

According to the school's website, many pupils at Caldicott subsequently win places at major independent schools, such as Eton College, Harrow School, Lancing College, Oundle School, Winchester College, Stowe School, Tonbridge School, Marlborough College, Wellington College, Haileybury College and Radley College.

The original Victorian house remains. New buildings have been created around it to provide more contemporary facilities. In 2004 the Centenary Hall was completed to provide a theatre for drama and music and a venue for functions. Currently underway is construction on a permanent, modern roofing fixture over the swimming pool to provide year-round swimming for the boys.

Burnham Beeches, a National Nature Reserve owned by the City of London Corporation is adjacent to the grounds and is often used by pupils.

Recent updates 
The school has undergone developments in recent years, primarily due to the change in Headmaster. In April 2017, Simon Doggart, who was Headmaster of Caldicott for two decades, retired due to ill health, subsequently he died on 23 July 2017 in East Wittering, Chichester, with his family by his side.

He was replaced by acting Head, Theroshene Naidoo, before Jeremy Banks was appointed as the new permanent Headmaster in April 2018. Jeremy Banks was educated in an all boys prep school in Nottingham and also boarded in Uppingham. After attaining a degree in Geography and Education from the University of Warwick, he was appointed as a teacher at Dulwich Prep. After 10 years at Dulwich, he became Deputy Head of Beachborough School in 2006, later becoming Headmaster in 2013. He was successful during his time as Head, with the school gaining record numbers as well as the record for senior school scholarships being broken every year he served as Headmaster. In 2010, Banks completed a master's degree in Educational Leadership (Distinction) and is currently a member of the Independent Association of Preparatory Schools (IAPS) as well as Chairman of the Education Committee.

Banks has implemented changes to the school in his time in charge, notably the removal of Saturday school for Years 3-4 and the inclusion of flexi and occasional boarding for boys in Years 3–6. Caldicott has suggested that these changes maintain the tradition of the school, while making it more inclusive for parents and an easier transition for boys.

In Tatler's recent school guide, they cited the new Deputy Head structure (having a separate Deputy Head for pastoral, academic and management) was raising the profile of academics and enhancing wellbeing provision. The guide goes on to mention that Caldicott has a 100% Common Entrance success rate which results in high-profile scholarships for many of the boys.

The Hitchin Scholarship 
In December 2021, Caldicott launched the Hitchin Scholarship under the goal of finding academic all-rounders with good character, an appetite for learning, and a passion for a wide range of interests, who wouldn't normally be able to afford Caldicott's school fees. Using the school's connection with senior schools, this level of support can potentially be maintained up to 18 years of age.

In 2022, following the inaugural recipients of the Hitchin Scholarship joining Caldicott in September, the school was commended with having the best bursary provision in Talk Education's Innovation in Education Awards.

While candidates are expected to be performing at a high level in the classroom, they also need to show excellence in at least one of the following optional areas:

 Sport (one of the school's core sports of rugby, cricket, or football)
 Music
 Art
 Drama

Up to five scholarships can be awarded each year, to boys joining Caldicott in Year 7. The scholarship uses funds in The Caldicott Foundation, which are raised through donations from past and present parents of the school.

Awards and commendations 
In recent years Caldicott has won, and been in contention for, a number of high-profile awards across a range of fields.

Some of these include:

 BSA's 'Supporting Junior Boarders' Award (2022)
 Winners of Talk Education's 'Bursary Provision' (2022)
 Highly Commended Pastoral Care - Muddy Stilettos Best Schools Awards (2022)
 Independent School of the Year for Sporting Provision (2019).
 Independent Prep School of the Year (2020 - finalist).
 Best Head of Prep School - Jeremy Banks (2020).
Further to this, the school's most recent Inspection by the Independent Schools Inspectorate included the following comments:

Core values 
The school states as its core values ”perseverance, integrity, courage, compassion and humour.”

History of sexual abuse 
On 30 September 2008 the school was the subject of a feature documentary, Chosen, transmitted on More4 as part of the "Real Stories" strand, about the sexual abuse that went on at the school during the late 1960s and early 1970s. The headmaster Peter Wright was active in this, as well as a number of other teachers, targeting boys good at sports and, to a lesser extent, in the choir. In The Guardian published on the same day, a former parent alleged that Lord Justice Scott Baker, former chairman of the board of Governors, and Headmaster Simon Doggart mishandled a case of alleged sexual abuse of their son by a teacher in the early 2000s.

Martin Carson was dismissed for sexual abuse of a pupil in 1972, and went on to teach at Chelmsford Hall School in Eastbourne, eventually becoming involved in the founding of the Harrodian School which was his last employment in education. In 2003 following the Channel 4 broadcast of an interview with two victims, he was arrested and charged, and pleaded guilty to charges assault and possessing indecent images of children in 2003.

On 4 December 2011, Peter Wright and Hugh Henry, another teacher, were charged with child sex offences alleged to have taken place between 1959 and 1970. For Henry, the charges cover his period at Gayhurst School as well as at Caldicott. They appeared in court in Aylesbury on 21 December 2011 charged with a total of 35 offences against 12 pupils. This was the second time that Peter Wright had been charged for child abuse offences; the first time, in 2003, the judge awarded a stay of proceedings predicated upon the passage of time since the offences were allegedly committed.

Hugh Henry was found guilty of 11 counts of indecency, and two of gross indecency, towards a child, and pleaded guilty. He was killed by a train shortly before he was due to return to court for sentencing, his death a presumed suicide.

On 18 December 2013 Peter Wright was convicted of sexually assaulting five pupils aged eight to 13 at Caldicott between 1959 and 1970. Wright was sentenced to 8 years' imprisonment on 6 February 2014.

Thames Valley Police on 1 May 2012 charged another former teacher, John Addrison, with sexual offences committed against children at the school between 1979 and 1981. Addrison was subsequently further charged with child sex offences committed at Moor Park School near Ludlow, Shropshire, between 1985 and 1988. He pleaded guilty and was sentenced to 5 years' prison but wasn't fined.

A further ex teacher, David Geddes, was also charged in November 2012, with four charges for offences against 3 school-children between 1975 and 1977.

Under ex-headmaster Simon Doggart, another incident of alleged child sexual abuse was reported; the headmaster and the chairman of the board of governors, Lord Justice Scott Baker, suspended the teacher (who did not return).

Houses 
Each pupil in the school is a member of one of four houses. These are:

 Cooper: named after John Shewell Cooper, the School's fourth headmaster. 
 Jenkins: named after Heald Jenkins, the founder and first headmaster. 
 McArthur: named after Harry McArthur, an influential Leys parent who aided the School financially. 
 Wood: named after F. Gordon Wood, the third headmaster of the School.

Notable alumni

 John Apthorp, Founder of Bejam Foods, now Iceland and Wizzard Wines, now Majestic Wines
 Ben Castle, British jazz musician, the son of entertainer Roy Castle.
 Nick Clegg, Former Liberal Democrat MP for Sheffield Hallam, leader of the Liberal Democrats and Deputy Prime Minister of the United Kingdom.
 Rodney Craig, British fencer who competed at the 1968 and 1972 Summer Olympics.
 Robert Diament, singer/songwriter of pop band Temposhark
 Alex Farquharson, curator and art critic, Director of Tate Britain
 Will Hoy (Decd, 2001), British Touring Car Champion 1991
 Tengku Hassanal Ibrahim, regent and crown prince of Pahang, Malaysia
 Ralph Izzard, journalist for the Daily Mail
 Adrian Jarvis, Harlequins FC rugby union player; selected for England Saxons 2008 squad
 Malcolm Lowry, poet and novelist
 Wilfrid Lowry, Birkenhead Park FC rugby union player, and England player.
 Brooks Newmark, former Conservative MP for Braintree and former Minister for Civil Society
 Ernest Saunders, former Chief executive of Guinness 1981–86, best known for being one of the "Guinness Four"
 Chris Sheasby, England rugby union player
 Ed Stoppard, actor
 Andrew Strauss, England cricketer and Captain

References

External links
 
 

Boarding schools in Buckinghamshire
Boys' schools in Buckinghamshire
Preparatory schools in Buckinghamshire
Educational institutions established in 1904
School sexual abuse scandals
1904 establishments in England